Radosław Kałużny (born 2 February 1974) is a retired Polish football player. He usually played a holding midfield role during his career, but was unusually effective at attacking for a defensive midfielder, his international goalscoring record evidence of that.

Club career
Born in Góra, Lower Silesian Voivodeship, Kałużny spent his first ten years in pro football in Poland. In 2001, he moved to Germany and stayed there for five years, playing for four teams. After another season in Cyprus, he last played for the Polish football club Jagiellonia Białystok and retired in summer 2008.

International career
Kałużny was capped 41 times for the Polish national team and scored 11 goals. He was a participant at the 2002 FIFA World Cup.

Post-retirement
After retirement, Kałużny found employment doing mainly manual labour in construction, warehousing and waste management.

Style of play
Kałużny's main footballing attribute was perhaps his ability to retain possession for long periods of a game, due to a combination of accurate passing and excellent ball control. He also had a particularly venomous long-range shot. Perhaps his best season in football was the 2000–01 season for Energie Cottbus, where his performances had many admirers. A criticism of Kałużny during his career was that his mental attributes were less than desirable. He was easily wound up by opposition players, and often faded from games where his team was losing and needed him the most.

Honours
Wisła Kraków
 Ekstraklasa: 1998–99 and 2000–01
 Ekstraklasa Cup: 2001

References

External links
 

1974 births
Living people
People from Góra
Sportspeople from Lower Silesian Voivodeship
Association football midfielders
Polish footballers
Poland international footballers
2002 FIFA World Cup players
Zagłębie Lubin players
Wisła Kraków players
FC Energie Cottbus players
Bayer 04 Leverkusen players
Rot-Weiss Essen players
AEL Limassol players
Bundesliga players
2. Bundesliga players
Ekstraklasa players
Cypriot First Division players
Polish expatriate footballers
Expatriate footballers in Germany
Expatriate footballers in Cyprus